Acción is a sports news program airing in syndication on several Spanish-language television networks.

External links

2003 American television series debuts
Spanish-language television programming in the United States